John Henry Juran (May 8, 1900 – December 22, 1972) was an American Negro league pitcher in the 1920s.

A native of Pratt City, Alabama, Juran was the brother of fellow Negro leaguer Eli Juran. Older brother Johnny played for the Birmingham Black Barons in 1923 and 1924. He died in Birmingham, Alabama in 1972 at age 72.

References

External links
 and Baseball-Reference Black Baseball stats and Seamheads

1900 births
1972 deaths
Birmingham Black Barons players
Baseball pitchers
Baseball players from Birmingham, Alabama
20th-century African-American sportspeople